The Buckinghamshire by-election, conducted on 22 September 1876, was held when  Prime Minister Benjamin Disraeli was raised to the peerage as the Earl of Beaconsfield. It was won by the Conservative candidate, Thomas Fremantle, with a majority of 186 over the Liberal party.

References

1876 elections in the United Kingdom
1876 in England
19th century in Buckinghamshire
By-elections to the Parliament of the United Kingdom in Buckinghamshire constituencies